This is a list of flag bearers who have represented Rwanda at the Olympics.

Flag bearers carry the national flag of their country at the opening ceremony of the Olympic Games.

See also
Rwanda at the Olympics

References

Rwanda at the Olympics
Rwanda
Olympic flagbearers
Olympics